John Hair and Son was an English brewer based in Melbourne, Derbyshire. It was founded in 1851, and acquired by Offiler's of Derby in 1954.

The original brewery buildings still exist in Church Street. It had one tied house and a small club trade. In 2016, the owners of the Chip and Pin micropub began selling traditional local ales, hoping they would be able to source the original Hair recipe and bring the beer back into production.

References

Breweries in England
Defunct breweries of the United Kingdom
Companies based in Derbyshire
Melbourne, Derbyshire